The French domains of Saint Helena is an estate of 14 ha (35 acres or 0.14 km2), in three separate parts, on the island of Saint Helena within the British Overseas Territory of Saint Helena, Ascension and Tristan da Cunha. 

The three properties are owned by the Government of France and are administered by the French Foreign Ministry which undertakes their management and maintenance. These consist of:

 Longwood House
 The small pavilion Briars
 Valley of the Tomb

These places are connected with the exile of Napoleon I in Saint Helena. They house a museum and displays on the life of the Emperor. Buildings have been restored as closely as possible to the state that they had in the Napoleonic period. They welcome from six to eight thousand visitors annually.

The museum is financed by the Fondation Napoléon and the buildings are maintained by the French Foreign Ministry.

Since 2004, the French estate in Saint Helena have been administratively under the consulate of France in Cape Town. They are administered locally by a curator who is also honorary consul of France, currently Michel Dancoisne-Martineau.

The detention of Napoleon I 

Following his defeat at Waterloo, Napoleon was exiled and deported by the British to the island of Saint Helena, where he landed in 1815. Napoleon's arrival occasioned an increase of the population of the island: near  soldiers and 500 sailors of the war flotilla, as well as the officials of the British Government, accompanied by their families, not forgetting the small French colony which lived in the circle of acquaintances of Napoleon I. Furthermore, the British, being afraid of a landing of French sailors to free the prisoner as at Elba, claimed Ascension Island - up to then uninhabited - to establish a naval garrison there.

Napoleon I died on 5 May 1821. The next day, the governor of the island, Sir Hudson Lowe, although in perpetual conflict with his former prisoner, personally came to make sure of his death and declared then to his circle of acquaintances: He was England’s greatest enemy, and mine too, but I forgive him everything. On the death of a great man like him, we should feel only deep concern and regret.

In accordance with his last wishes, Napoleon was interred on 9 May 1821 near a spring, in what was then known as the Valley of the Geranium, but has since been called the "Valley of the Tomb ". On 27 May 1821, all the remaining French officials left the island. Nineteen years after Napoleon's death, King Louis-Philippe was able to obtain from the United Kingdom the return of remains of the ex-emperor. The exhumation of Napoleon's body took place on 15 October 1840; he was then repatriated to France and interred in the Invalides, in Paris.

From 1854, the Emperor Napoleon III negotiated with the British Government the purchase of Longwood House and of the valley of the Grave, which became French land properties in 1858, under the name of "French Domains of Saint-Helena" and managed since by the French Foreign Ministry. The small pavilion Briars, the Emperor's first house on the island, was added to the domain in 1959, when its last owner donated it to France.

See also 
 French colonial empire
 List of French possessions and colonies

References

External links 
 
 Site des domaines français de Sainte-Hélène 
 Journal du conservateur des domaines français de Sainte-Hélène 
 Napoléon à Sainte-Hélène. 

French government properties on Saint Helena
Overseas France